Harald Devold (13 May 1964 – 19 February 2016) was a Norwegian jazz musician (alto saxophone, soprano saxophone and flute) from Vadsø, Finnmark. He is also known as a big band organizer, music producer and music political activist. He was born and raised in Langevåg, Sula, Møre og Romsdal.

Biography 
Devold received his musical education at the Norwegian Academy of Music. He was known for his versatility as a musician and has since the 1980s been one of Norway's most commonly used freelance musicians. He was a driving force for the big band Oslo Groove Company, which received the 1990 Spellemannprisen.

Devold settled in Vadsø (1995) and then worked as head of Scene Finnmark, which inter alia disposes regional musician groups LINK and Ensemble Noor. He was a music producer for Scene Finnmark. He helped to initiate a number of productions, which toured the Barents Region and played a key role in establishing contacts between Norwegian and Russian musicians. Among these productions, one find artists like Angélique Kidjo, Morten Abel, Frode Alnæs, Hallgeir Pedersen, Kai Somby, Sondre Lerche, Mari Boine, Petter Carlsen, Marte Heggelund, Ivar Thomassen, Marit Hætta Øverli, Inga Juuso, Anne Grete Preus, Hector Bingert and Knut Kristansen. As a musician, he has also collaborated with various Sami artists, such as Siellu Dalkas, releasing an album in 2006. Devold was selected in 2005 as Chairman for Norsk Jazzforum (NJF). He died on February 19, 2016, from cancer.

Honors 
2015: Culture Price from Vadsø municipality

References

External links 
Harald Devold ny styreleder i Norsk jazzforum at Ballade.no  
Scene Finnmark for Sami music and culture

20th-century Norwegian saxophonists
21st-century Norwegian saxophonists
Norwegian jazz saxophonists
Norwegian composers
Norwegian male composers
Musicians from Langevåg
1964 births
2016 deaths
20th-century saxophonists
Norwegian Academy of Music alumni
20th-century Norwegian male musicians
21st-century Norwegian male musicians
Male jazz musicians
Oslo Groove Company members
Deaths from cancer in Norway
People from Vadsø